John Comiskey may refer to:

 John Comiskey (politician), American politician in Chicago, Illinois
 John Comiskey (Canadian football), former Canadian football player
 John Patrick Comiskey, Canadian Roman Catholic priest and author